George Hunt (May 1, 1841 – March 17, 1901) was an American politician and lawyer.

Born in Knox County, Ohio, Hunt moved with his sister and her husband to Edgar County, Illinois. Hunt worked on the farm and went to school at Edgar Academy in Paris, Illinois and Waveland Academy in Indiana. Hunt taught school. During the American Civil War, Hunt served in the 12th Illinois Volunteer Infantry Regiment. He then was superintendent of schools and studied law. In 1867, Hunt was admitted to the Illinois bar and opened a law office in Paris, Illinois. Hunt served as master in chancery for the Illinois circuit court. From 1878 to 1894, Hunt served in the Illinois State Senate. Hunt then served as Illinois Attorney General from 1885 to 1893. In 1893, Hunt moved to Chicago, Illinois and continued to practice law. Hunt died at his house in Riverside, Illinois after a long illness.

Notes

1841 births
1901 deaths
Politicians from Chicago
People from Paris, Illinois
People from Knox County, Ohio
People of Illinois in the American Civil War
Illinois state senators
Illinois Attorneys General
People from Riverside, Illinois
19th-century American politicians